Monica Seles was the defending champion, but could not compete this year due to the stabbing received in late April.

Amanda Coetzer won the title by defeating Kimiko Date 6–3, 6–2 in the final.

Seeds

Draw

Finals

Top half

Bottom half

References

External links
 Official results archive (ITF)
 Official results archive (WTA)

Nichirei International Championships
1993 WTA Tour